Mario Thomas Barrios (born May 18, 1995) is an American professional boxer who held the WBA (Regular) super lightweight title from 2019 to June 2021. As of October 2021, he is ranked as the world's ninth-best active super lightweight by The Ring.

Professional career
Barrios turned professional in 2013. On May 11, 2019, Barrios faced Juan Jose Velasco. Barrios got the KO win via a spectacular body shot in the second round.

WBA (Regular) super lightweight champion

Barrios vs. Akhmedov 
On September 28, 2019, Barrios was victorious against undefeated Batyr Akhmedov by unanimous decision, with scores of 114–112, 115–111, 116–111, to win the vacant WBA (Regular) super lightweight title in a tough contest on the undercard of Errol Spence Jr. vs. Shawn Porter, in which Barrios dropped Akhmedov twice in the fourth and twelfth rounds but took considerable punishment resulting in most of his face being swollen. The decision was considered controversial by many pundits and observers.

Barrios vs. Karl 
On October 31, 2020 in front of his hometown crowd at Alamodrome in San Antonio, Texas on the undercard of Gervonta Davis vs. Léo Santa Cruz, Barrios defended his WBA (Regular) title with a sixth-round technical knockout victory against Ryan Karl. In the sixth round, an accidental head clash caused a bad cut over Karl’s right eye, and blood poured down his face. After the cut was examined by the ringside doctor, the fight resumed and the two men immediately went hard after each other, until Barrios dropped Karl during with a pair of left hooks to the chin during a fierce exchange. As soon as Karl went down, the referee called off the fight at 2 minutes, 23 seconds. At the time of the stoppage, Barrios led 48–47, 49–46, 49–46 on the judges' scorecards.

Barrios vs. Davis 
Barrios faced fellow undefeated Gervonta Davis on Showtime PPV on June 26, 2021 at the State Farm Arena in Atlanta. Davis knocked Barrios down twice in the eighth round, and again in the eleventh round en route to an eleventh-round technical knockout victory, handing Barrios his first professional loss. At the time of the stoppage, Barrios was down 97–91 and 96–92 twice on the judges' scorecards.

Barrios vs. Thurman 
After the loss to Davis, Barrios decided to challenge Keith Thurman, who, like him, was coming off of a loss. Barrios lost a clear unanimous decision with scores of 117–111 and two scores of 118–110.

Professional boxing record

Personal life

Mario's sister Selina Barrios is also a professional boxer.

See also
List of world light-welterweight boxing champions

References

External links

Mario Barrios - Profile, News Archive & Current Rankings at Box.Live

 

1995 births
Living people
American male boxers
American boxers of Mexican descent
Boxers from Texas
Sportspeople from San Antonio
Light-welterweight boxers
Welterweight boxers
World light-welterweight boxing champions
World Boxing Association champions